
Gmina Brok is an urban-rural gmina (administrative district) in Ostrów Mazowiecka County, Masovian Voivodeship, in east-central Poland.

Villages
Apart from the town of Brok, Gmina Brok contains the villages and settlements of Bojany, Laskowizna, Nowe Kaczkowo, Puzdrowizna and Stare Kaczkowo.

Neighbouring gminas
Gmina Brok is bordered by the gminas of Brańszczyk, Małkinia Górna, Ostrów Mazowiecka and Sadowne.

References

Polish official population figures 2006

Brok
Ostrów Mazowiecka County